Dieter Lindner may refer to:

 Dieter Lindner (footballer) (born 1939), German former football player
 Dieter Lindner (racewalker) (born 1937), former East German racewalker